Waverly is an unincorporated community and census-designated place (CDP) in Codington County, South Dakota, United States. The population was 22 at the 2020 census.

The community derives its name from the Waverley Novels.

Geography

Demographics

22 people in the 2020 census. 37 people in the 2010 census.

References

Census-designated places in Codington County, South Dakota
Census-designated places in South Dakota